Raina Saumi Grahana Ramdhani (born 24 October 1995) is an Indonesian swimmer. She competed in the women's 800 metre freestyle event at the 2017 World Aquatics Championships.

References

1995 births
Living people
Indonesian female swimmers
Place of birth missing (living people)
Indonesian female freestyle swimmers
20th-century Indonesian women
21st-century Indonesian women